Ghribi is a surname. Notable people with the surname include:

Ali Ghribi (born 1974), Tunisian paralympic athlete
Habiba Ghribi (born 1984), Tunisian middle and long-distance runner

See also
Gribi, a surname